De México llegó el amor (English: From Mexico came the love) is a 1940 Argentine black-and-white film, directed by Richard Harlan and written by Ariel Cortazzo and Conrado de Keller. It premiered on July 16, 1940.

Cast
 Amanda Ledesma 
 Tito Guízar
 Carlos Bertoldi
 Max Citelli
 Adrián Cúneo
 Tito Gómez
 Zully Moreno
 Pepita Muñoz
 José Olarra
 José Olivero
 Margarita Padín
 Fernando Ponchel
 Mirtha Reid
 Adelaida Soler
 Armando de Vicente
 Pepe Biondi

External links

1940 films
1940s Spanish-language films
Argentine black-and-white films
Argentine comedy films
1940 comedy films
1940s Argentine films